Arnor may refer to:

People
 Arnor Angeli, Belgian footballer
 Arnór Guðjohnsen, Icelandic footballer
 Arnór Borg Guðjohnsen, Icelandic footballer, his son
 Arnór Hannibalsson, Icelandic philosopher, historian and translator
 Arnór Ingvi Traustason, Icelandic basketball player
 Arnor Njøs, Norwegian soil researcher
 Arnor Sighvatsson, Icelandic economist
 Arnór Smárason, Icelandic footballer
 Arnór Sveinn Aðalsteinsson, Icelandic footballer
 Arnórr jarlaskáld, Icelandic Skald
 Einar Arnórsson, Minister for Iceland
 Jón Arnór Stefánsson, Icelandic basketball player

Fiction
 Arnor (Middle-earth), a kingdom of Men in Tolkien's Middle-earth
 Arnor, a race of beings in the video game Galactic Civilizations II: Twilight of the Arnor